Jason R. Wiles is an American biologist who is an associate professor of biology at Syracuse University. His research focuses on education in the life and earth sciences, with a particular emphasis on the teaching and learning of biological evolution. Wiles was elected fellow of the American Association for the Advancement of Science in 2022.

Career
Wiles grew up in Arkansas and attended Harding University, earning a bachelor's degree in biology with a minor in Bible. He then completed master's coursework from Portland State University. After his PhD from McGill University in Montreal, Canada, he stayed there as a co-manager of the Evolution Education Research Centre.

At Syracuse, he also holds courtesy appointments in the Department of Science Teaching and the Department of Earth and Environmental Sciences. He teaches both introductory and advanced courses in the life sciences.

Wiles  is a researcher in the field of STEM education and Discipline-Based Education Research (DBER). He has been involved in various initiatives aimed at increasing the representation of underrepresented students in STEM fields, including the NSF-funded ERRUPT grant, SUSTAIN, and CHANcE programs. Wiles has received recognition for his work in teaching, advocacy, and research, including awards from the Technology Alliance of Central New York, the Linnean Society of London, the Society for the Study of Evolution, and the National Center for Science Education.

Awards and honors 
2022  Elected Fellow of the American Association for the Advancement of Science for "distinguished contributions to science education, particularly for research on and advocacy for evolution education and innovative leadership in recruiting and retaining underrepresented populations in science."
2021 Friend of Darwin award
2021 Four-Year College & University Section Research in Biology Education Award by the National Association of Biology Teachers

Selected publications

References

External links
 

Living people
Year of birth missing (living people)
21st-century American academics
21st-century American biologists
Academics from Arkansas
Fellows of the American Association for the Advancement of Science
Harding University alumni
McGill University alumni
Academic staff of McGill University
Mississippi State University alumni
Portland State University alumni
Syracuse University faculty